Air Vice Marshal (retd.) Abdul Ghaffar Mahmud (born 1934) is a former chief of the Bangladesh Air Force. He negotiated the release of hostages from the hijacked Japan Airlines Flight 472. For his role in keeping the situation under control and securing the lives of every single passenger, Japanese government had conferred upon him the "Order of the Rising Sun, Gold and Silver Star" awards.

Early life 
Mahmud was born in 1934. His father taught at a Aliya Madrasah and Mahmud studied at a Madrassah in Kolkata. After the 1947 Partition of India, he and his family moved to East Pakistan.

Career 
Mahmud joined the Pakistan Air Force in 1952.

Mahmud was a transport pilot of the Douglas C-47 Skytrain transport airlift aircraft in the Pakistan Air Force.

During the Liberation War he was posted as a Wing Commander in the high altitude region of Gilgit. He was repatriated to Independent Bangladesh in 1973 and made director of Biman Bangladesh Airlines on the orders of General M. A. G. Osmani. He resigned from Biman Bangladesh Airlines after the chairman of the airlines revoked the suspension of a pilot without his consultation. He found himself at a disadvantage at Bangladesh Air Force were promotion priority was given to veterans of Bangladesh Liberation War. After the 15 August 1975 Bangladeshi coup d'état and assassination of Sheikh Mujibur Rahman, the Chief of Air Staff, A. K. Khandker, was removed and posted to a diplomatic mission. Khandker was replaced by Muhammad Ghulam Tawab who was replaced by Khademul Bashar. Mahmud succeeded Bashar, who died in a plane crash, as Chief of Air Staff. He was the chief of Bangladesh Air Force from 5 September 1976 to 8 December 1977. He was part of a delegation that asked President Abu Sadat Muhammad Sayem to relinquish power in favor of General Ziaur Rahman.

In 1977 he negotiated with the Japanese Red Army who had hijacked Japan Airlines Flight 472 and landed the flight in Dhaka Airport. He worked to get the hostages freed. During the hostage crises on 1 October 1977 Bangladesh Air Force mutiny took place, Group Captain Ansar Chowdhury was killed beside Mahmud. Captain Sadik Hasan Rumi led an operation to rescue Abdul Gafoor Mahmud, Chief of Air Staff of Bangladesh Air Force. His brother in law Group Captain Raas Masud was killed in the mutiny. Squadron Leader Md. Abdul Matin and Wing Commander Anwar Ali Shaikh were also killed in the mutiny. Mahmud resigned in December 1977 over the fallout of the mutiny and subsequent mass trials.

Mahmud became the minister for food, health and rehabilitation in the cabinet of President Hussain Muhammad Ershad.

In April 2017, Mahmud was awarded the Order of the Rising Sun, Gold and Silver Star for his role in negotiating with the hijackers of Japan Airlines Flight 472.

Personal life 
Mahmud married Syeda Asiya Begum in 1957 and they got a divorce in 1964. He remarried to Hasina Maya.

Bibliography 
 My Destiny-Autobiography.

References 

Living people
Bangladesh Air Force air marshals
Chiefs of Air Staff (Bangladesh)
1934 births
Bangladeshi people of Indian descent
People from Kolkata